Claybank may refer to:

Claybank, Saskatchewan
Claybank Brick Plant
Claybanks Township, Michigan
The red dun horse coat color